, born February 2, 1949 in Shimonoseki, was one of the three Japanese Red Army (JRA) members who attacked the French embassy in The Hague in 1974 and was the person who detonated a car bomb in front of a USO club in Naples in 1988.

Overview
In 1976, Okudaira was arrested along with Toshihiko Hidaka on suspicion of a forged passport when he entered Jordan. Hidaka committed suicide during a police investigation. Okudaira was deported to Japan on October 13, 1976, along with Hidaka's body in 1977, He was released from the country after extrajudicial measures in the Dhaka Japan Airlines Hijacking case.

Okudaira was convicted in absentia in the United States on April 9, 1993, for the Naples bombing. Okudaira is also a suspect in the June 1987 car bombing and mortar attack against the U.S. Embassy in Rome. Okudaira currently remains at large. Through the Rewards for Justice program, the United States government is offering up to $5,000,000 for information leading to his arrest.

 the details of Okudaira's life and or death are unknown, and he is wanted internationally. Photographs arranged after April 2010 were replaced with those taken in 1998.

References

 New York Times April 16, 1988

1949 births
Japanese communists
Living people
People from Shimonoseki
Japanese mass murderers
Fugitives wanted by the United States
Japanese Red Army